The 2017 American Athletic Conference Football Championship Game was held on Saturday, December 2, 2017. This was the third year that the AAC Championship game is played. The game was a rematch of the September 30 matchup, which UCF won 40-13.

Teams

Memphis

The Memphis Tigers football team is a member of the American Athletic Conference in its West Division. They represented the West Division in the American Athletic Conference Championship Game. The Tigers entered the game 10–1 (7–1 in The American), their only loss coming at the hands of UCF back in September. Memphis was the second-highest scoring team in Division I FBS, second only to UCF. Memphis was seeking its second AAC championship title. The Tigers were co-champions of the AAC in 2014.

UCF

The UCF Knights football team is a member of the American Athletic Conference in its East Division. They represented the East Division in the American Athletic Conference Championship Game. The Knights were the highest-scoring offense in Division I FBS, and ranked in the top ten in the nation in total yards per game, and passing yards per game. The Knights completed their football program's first undefeated regular season (11–0). The Knights were seeking their third AAC title. UCF were AAC champions in 2013, and co-champions in 2014.

Game summary

First quarter
Memphis won the coin toss and elected to receive. On the fifth play from scrimmage, Darrell Henderson fumbled at the UCF 45 yard line, and it was recovered by Shaquem Griffin of UCF. McKenzie Milton threw a 24-yard touchdown pass to Dredrick Snelson, and the Knights took a 7–0 lead. After a 3-and-out by Memphis, UCF added a field goal for a 10–0 lead. On the next possession, the Tigers drove 75 yards, all rushing plays, and it was capped off by a 3-yard touchdown run by Patrick Taylor. McKenzie Milton answered with consecutive pass completions to Jordan Akins of 20 yards and 49 yards, respectively, the second of which Akins broke away ran untouched for the touchdown.

Second quarter
Memphis dominated most of the second quarter, highlighted by miscues by the Knights, particularly on offense. Tigers quarterback Riley Ferguson threw two touchdown passes, including a 68-yard bomb to a wide open Anthony Miller. The Knights committed three turnovers in the second quarter, a fumble by Dredrick Snelson, and two red zone interceptions by McKenzie Milton. In the final two minutes, the Tigers drove to the UCF 9 yard line. Riley Patterson kicked a 27-yard field goal as time expired in the first half. Memphis led at halftime 31–24.

Third quarter
UCF bounced back in the third quarter. Memphis tried to capitalize on their momentum from the second quarter, and opened the half with a surprise onside kick. However, the onside kick attempt failed. McKenzie Milton had two touchdown runs, and threw for another touchdown. Memphis managed only a field goal in the quarter. The Knights were back in the lead by the score of 45–34.

Fourth quarter
Memphis was driving into Knights territory as the fourth quarter began. With 13:34 remaining in regular, Riley Patterson missed a 46-yard field goal attempt. The Knights managed to burn nearly four minutes off the clock with a 10-play, 57-yard drive, resulting in a field goal. Trailing by 14, the Tigers answered quickly. Running back Tony Pollard took a hand off 66 yards down the sidelines for a touchdown, and the score was now 48–41. Memphis tied the game 48–48 with just over 4 minutes left in regulation. Ferguson threw a 10-yard touchdown pass to Anthony Miller in the left side of the endzone.

The Tigers defense held the Knights to a three-and-out, and forced a punt. Mac Loudermilk's punt went only 31 yards, and a Fair Catch Interference penalty advanced the Tigers to the 43 yard line. The Tigers drove to the UCF 34 yard line, and with 33 seconds remaining in regulation, lined up for a potential game-winning 46-yard field goal attempt. The field goal attempt was blocked and recovered by the Knights, but not before the Tigers were called for Delay of Game. The penalty gave the Tigers a second chance at a game-winning field goal attempt. Riley Patterson's 51-yard field goal attempt sailed wide left.

The Knights took over at the 34 yard line, but Knights quarterback McKenzie Milton threw an interception, his third of the day. With 14 seconds to go, Memphis quarterback Riley Ferguson was sacked by Titus Davis, and the clock expired.

First overtime
UCF won the coin toss and elected to go on defense first during the first overtime period. Memphis committed a Delay of Game penalty, and an Offensive Holding penalty, pushing them back to the 40 yard line. On the next play, UCF was called for Pass Interference, and the Tigers got a first down. Riley Ferguson threw a 15-yard touchdown pass to a wide open Anthony Miller and Memphis was ahead 55–48.

UCF went on offense and tied the game. Adrian Killins scored a 2-yard touchdown pass, running to the left, just inside the pylon for the score. The game was tied 55–55.

Second overtime
In the second overtime period, UCF was on offense first. On 1st down, McKenzie Milton threw a 10-yard completion to Marlon Williams, and Memphis was called for Roughing the Passer, advancing the Knights to the Memphis 10 yard line. Milton ran the ball 9 yards down to the 1 yard line, and on the next play, Otis Anderson punched the ball in to the endzone for the touchdown. UCF led 62–55.

Memphis took over on offense. The Tigers faced a 4th down & 7 at the UCF 22, a stop by the Knights would have ended the game. Riley Ferguson threw a clutch 17-yard pass to Anthony Miller, who made the catch at the UCF 5 yard line.

Facing 2nd down & Goal at the UCF 9 yard line, Riley Ferguson dropped back to pass, but was pressured by Shaquem Griffin. Ferguson's pass was intercepted by Tre Neal at the 4 yard line to end the game.

The two teams combined for 1,479 yard of offense, and 117 points. It was the highest-scoring conference championship game in the history of FBS. UCF quarterback McKenzie Milton threw for 494 yards, and 5 touchdown passes. Memphis quarterback Riley Ferguson threw for 471 yards, and 4 touchdowns, while two Memphis running backs (Henderson and Taylor) each rushed for over 100 yards.

Scoring summary

Source:

Statistics

References

Championship
American Athletic Conference Football Championship Game
Memphis Tigers football games
UCF Knights football games
Sports competitions in Orlando, Florida
American Athletic Conference Football Championship Game
American Athletic Conference Football Championship Game
2010s in Orlando, Florida